Youtha Anthony Fowler (born January 4, 1969), better known by his stage name DJ Nabs, is an American DJ and record producer. He has been part of the Atlanta hip hop scene since the late 1980s and worked with hip hop artists such as Kris Kross, Da Brat, Bow Wow, Xscape, Speech, and Trick Daddy, hosted several radio shows, and toured with Mariah Carey, Ciara and Michael Jackson. He published his compilation album In the Lab with DJ Nabs - The Live Album in 1998. Nabs founded the MAD DJ Academy, and hosted and co-created Ultimate Mad DJ Contest, an event showcasing emerging DJs.

Life and career
Nabs was born on January 4, 1969, in Durham, North Carolina, United States, and grew up in the Walltown Neighborhood. He purchased the Rapper's Delight at the age of ten. He spun records at parties in 10th grade and later joined the marching band at his college, North Carolina Central University. Nabs came to Atlanta in 1988, when the local rap scene began to flourish. He started as a mix show DJ on WVEE and the resident DJ at Club Kaya's Old School Sundays.
 
While attending Morris Brown College, Nabs worked with a trio called Secret Society. Two of the group's members, Speech and Headliner, would eventually create Arrested Development, and Nabs would remix their song Tennessee. Through their manager, Michael Mauldin, Nabs met Mauldin's son Jermaine Dupri. He became So So Def's exclusive tour DJ for Da Brat, Bow Wow, Xscape, and Dupri. Nabs was the tour DJ and music director for Dupri's protégés, Kris Kross. It was on their global tour in the 1990s, during the apex of their popularity, that he opened for Michael Jackson.
 
After touring with Kris Kross for four years, Nabs made it to Hot 97.5 as the second afternoon drive personality in the station's history, hosting a popular show, "In The Lab With DJ Nabs". During this time, he introduced Ludacris to the music industry. He worked for Hot 97.5 (which would become Hot 107.9) in the mid-2000s as well.
 
Nabs released In The Lab With DJ Nabs - The Live Album for Columbia Records in 1998. It featured a then-unknown Ludacris, as well as live appearances by Big Daddy Kane, Wyclef Jean and Kurtis Blow. Nabs toured with Mariah Carey and Ciara.
 
He produced the remix for "In The Wind" (2002) by Trick Daddy, Cee-Lo, and Big Boi. Nabs released The Product & The Power mixtape compilation (2005), which was followed by Product & The Power II (2008). The film Diary of a Mad DJ was made in 2010 as a prelude to a documentary about Nabs' life, American DJ Story.
 
Nabs founded the MAD DJ Academy and hosted Ultimate Mad DJ Contest, an event showcasing emerging DJs, co-created by him and Michael Mauldin. He toured as a solo DJ to Taiwan, France, Turkey, Greece, and Romania. In the meantime, he started working on Boom 102.9 in Atlanta.

Discography

Compilation album
In the Lab with DJ Nabs - The Live Album

Mixtapes

Producer

Composer

Remixes

Turntables

Guest appearances

Recognition
DJ Nabs was honored at "Respect the DJ", an Atlanta event that showcased DJ's of various genres from Hip Hop to Top 40.
 
He was featured as a notable pioneer in southern rap music in the 2014 "VH1 Rock Docs ATL: The Untold Story of Atlanta's Rise in the Rap Game."

Personal life
Nabs married in 2009. He participates in amateur boxing tournaments for charity.

References

External links
 

1969 births
Living people
American hip hop DJs
Record producers from North Carolina
Columbia Records artists